Below is a list of all the South American countries, in South America of geographical area. South America's total geographical area is 17,732,850 km² or 1.618.58.478545.7546.865 km

Countries

Territories 
These territories, also located in South America, are not sovereign nations but former colonies of Europe and countries under control of France and the UK.

Transcontinental countries 
Panama is not regarded as a transcontinental country but the country is sometimes included in South America due to being part of Colombia prior to its secession in 1903. The island of Trinidad is sometimes included in South America, which then makes Trinidad and Tobago a transcontinental country.

See also
List of South American countries by population
List of African countries by area
List of Asian countries by area
List of European countries by area
List of North American countries by area
List of Oceanian countries by area

References

Countries by geographical area
South American countries
Area